Valeriya Belaya (born 4 July 1998) is a Belarusian footballer who plays as a midfielder for Zvezda Perm in the Russian Women's Football Championship and has appeared for the Belarus women's national team.

Career
Belaya has been capped for the Belarus national team, appearing for the team during the 2019 FIFA Women's World Cup qualifying cycle.

International goals

References

External links
 
 
 

1998 births
Living people
Belarusian women's footballers
Belarus women's international footballers
Women's association football midfielders
FC Minsk (women) players